Tabriz Hasanov (born 15 June 1967) is a retired Azerbaijani footballer.

Club career
Tabriz Hasanov made his professional debut in the Soviet Top League in 1985 for Neftchi Baku.

He played as a professional football player for Neftchi Baku, Termists PFC Baku, Göyazan, Qarabağ  and ANS Pivani Baku.

Managerial career
He began his coach career since 2001. He worked as coach-assistant of U-21 national team in 2004–2006, Karvan in 2004–2007, as a head coach of Karvan, Azerbaijan U-15 national team, Azerbaijan U-16 national team and Azerbaijan U-17 national team.
On 7 April 2015, he has appointed as a head coach of Azerbaijan U17 to replace Mirbaghir Isayev.

Hasanov got "B" category coach license in 2004, and "A" category in 2005. He is "UEFA Pro" category coach since 2012.

References

1967 births
Living people
Footballers from Baku
Soviet footballers
Azerbaijani footballers
Azerbaijani football managers
Azerbaijan Premier League players
Qarabağ FK players
Association football midfielders
Neftçi PFK players